The Certificat de formation à la sécurité (CFS) (in English Safety training certificate) is the French national degree required to be a flight attendant in France. It replaces the Certificat de Sécurité Sauvetage (CSS) since the 16th of July 2008. It consists of a theoretical and a practical part.

Theoretical part 
The safety part (Modules: A-10, B-20, C-30, E-50, F-60, H-80) covers the following topics: aeronautical knowledge, regulation, equipment safety regulatory, safety, dangerous goods, communication, resource management (CRM), general instructions in normal flight, general instructions in an emergency and survival.

The First Aid part (Module: D-40) covers the following topics : basics of anatomy and physiology, aviation and reactions of the organism, the role of the cabin crew, onboard incidents, bleeding - circulatory - respiratory distress, the abdominal pathologies and traumatic, burns, childbirth, tropical diseases and triage.

Practical part 

The safety part covers the following topics : knowledge and use of emergency equipment, running in the fumes / off lights, swimming pool training, rescue equipment vest, towing, boarding boats, use of life jackets and canoes / Signalling Tools / Survival, passenger management, communication and practiced CRM.

The First Aid part covers the following topics: case studies related to emergencies, seat extraction, cardiopulmonary resuscitation manikin, treatment of bleeding and fractures, splints and bandages, using of the first aid kit.

References 

Academic degrees of France
Aviation licenses and certifications
Aviation safety in France
Civil Air Transport